Gilles Müller was the defending champion, but he did not participate this year. He played in Estoril instead.

Sam Groth won the tournament, defeating Konstantin Kravchuk in the final.

Seeds

Draw

Finals

Top half

Bottom half

References
 Main Draw
 Qualifying Draw

Santaizi ATP Challenger - Singles
2015 Singles